The McDonnell FH Phantom is a twinjet fighter aircraft designed and first flown during World War II for the United States Navy. The Phantom was the first purely jet-powered aircraft to land on an American aircraft carrier and the first jet deployed by the United States Marine Corps. Although only 62 FH-1s were built it helped prove the viability of carrier-based jet fighters. As McDonnell's first successful fighter, it led to the development of the follow-on F2H Banshee, which was one of the two most important naval jet fighters of the Korean War; combined, the two established McDonnell as an important supplier of navy aircraft.

McDonnell chose to bring the name back with the Mach 2–class McDonnell Douglas F-4 Phantom II, the most versatile and widely used western combat aircraft of the Vietnam War era.

The FH Phantom was originally designated the FD Phantom, but this was changed as the aircraft entered production.

Design and development
In early 1943, aviation officials at the United States Navy were impressed with McDonnell's audacious XP-67 Bat project. McDonnell was invited by the navy to cooperate in the development of a shipboard jet fighter, using an engine from the turbojets under development by Westinghouse Electric Corporation. Three prototypes were ordered on 30 August 1943 and the designation XFD-1 was assigned. Under the 1922 United States Navy aircraft designation system, the letter "D" before the dash designated the aircraft's manufacturer. The Douglas Aircraft Company had previously been assigned this letter, but the USN elected to reassign it to McDonnell because Douglas had not provided any fighters for navy service in years.

McDonnell engineers evaluated a number of engine combinations, varying from eight  diameter engines down to two engines of  diameter. The final design used the two  engines after it was found to be the lightest and simplest configuration. The engines were buried in the wing root to keep intake and exhaust ducts short, offering greater aerodynamic efficiency than underwing nacelles, and the engines were angled slightly outwards to protect the fuselage from the hot exhaust blast. Placement of the engines in the middle of the airframe allowed the cockpit with its bubble-style canopy to be placed ahead of the wing, granting the pilot excellent visibility in all directions. This engine location also freed up space under the nose, allowing designers to use tricycle gear, thereby elevating the engine exhaust path and reducing the risk that the hot blast would damage the aircraft carrier deck. The construction methods and aerodynamic design of the Phantom were fairly conventional for the time; the aircraft had unswept wings, a conventional empennage, and an aluminum monocoque structure with flush riveted aluminum skin. Folding wings were used to reduce the width of the aircraft in storage configuration. Provisions for four .50-caliber (12.7 mm) machine guns were made in the nose, while racks for eight  High Velocity Aircraft Rockets could be fitted under the wings, although these were seldom used in service. Adapting a jet to carrier use was a much greater challenge than producing a land-based fighter because of slower landing and takeoff speeds required on a small carrier deck. The Phantom used split flaps on both the folding and fixed wing sections to enhance low-speed landing performance, but no other high-lift devices were used. Provisions were also made for Rocket Assisted Take Off (RATO) bottles to improve takeoff performance.

When the first XFD-1, serial number 48235, was completed in January 1945, only one Westinghouse 19XB-2B engine was available for installation. Ground runs and taxi tests were conducted with the single engine, and such was the confidence in the aircraft that the first flight on 26 January 1945 was made with only the one turbojet engine. During flight tests, the Phantom became the first U.S. Navy aircraft to exceed 500 mph (434 kn, 805 km/h). With successful completion of tests, a production contract was awarded on 7 March 1945 for 100 FD-1 aircraft. With the end of the war, the Phantom production contract was reduced to 30 aircraft, but was soon increased back to 60.

The first prototype was lost in a fatal crash on 1 November 1945, but the second and final Phantom prototype (serial number 48236) was completed early the next year and became the first purely jet-powered aircraft to operate from an American aircraft carrier, completing four successful takeoffs and landings on 21 July 1946, from  near Norfolk, Virginia. At the time, she was the largest carrier serving with the U.S. Navy, allowing the aircraft to take off without assistance from a catapult. The second prototype crashed on 26 August 1946.

Production Phantoms incorporated a number of design improvements. These included provisions for a flush-fitting centerline drop tank, an improved gunsight, and the addition of speed brakes. The top of the vertical tail had a more square shape than the rounder tail used on the prototypes, and a smaller rudder was used to resolve problems with control surface clearance discovered during test flights. The amount of framing in the windshield was reduced to enhance pilot visibility.

Halfway through the production run, the navy reassigned the designation letter "D" back to Douglas, with the Phantom being redesignated FH-1. Including the two prototypes, a total of 62 Phantoms were finally produced, with the last FH-1 rolling off the assembly line in May 1948.

Realizing that the production of more powerful jet engines was imminent, McDonnell engineers proposed a more powerful variant of the Phantom while the original aircraft was still under development – a proposal that would lead to the design of the Phantom's replacement, the F2H Banshee. Although the new aircraft was originally envisioned as a modified Phantom, the need for heavier armament, greater internal fuel capacity, and other improvements eventually led to a substantially heavier and bulkier aircraft that shared few parts with its agile predecessor. Despite this, the two aircraft were similar enough that McDonnell was able to complete its first F2H-1 in August 1948, a mere three months after the last FH-1 had rolled off the assembly line.

Operational history

The first Phantoms were delivered to USN fighter squadron VF-17A (later redesignated VF-171) in August 1947; the squadron received a full complement of 24 aircraft on 29 May 1948. Beginning in November 1947, Phantoms were delivered to United States Marine Corps squadron VMF-122, making it the first USMC combat squadron to deploy jets. VF-17A became the USN's first fully operational jet carrier squadron when it deployed aboard  on 5 May 1948.

The Phantom was one of the first jets used by the U.S. military for exhibition flying. Three Phantoms used by the Naval Air Test Center were used by a unique demonstration team called the Gray Angels, whose members consisted entirely of naval aviators holding the rank of rear admiral (Daniel V. Gallery, Apollo Soucek and Edgar A. Cruise.) The team's name was an obvious play on the name of the recently formed U.S. Navy Blue Angels, who were still flying propeller-powered Grumman F8F Bearcats at the time. The "Grays" flew in various air shows during the summer of 1947, but the team was abruptly disbanded after their poorly timed arrival at a September air show in Cleveland, Ohio, nearly caused a head-on low-altitude collision with a large formation of other aircraft; their Phantoms were turned over to test squadron VX-3. The VMF-122 Phantoms were later used for air show demonstrations until they were taken out of service in 1949, with the team being known alternately as the Marine Phantoms or the Flying Leathernecks.

The Phantom's service as a frontline fighter would be short-lived. Its limited range and light armament – notably, its inability to carry bombs – made it best suited for duty as a point-defence interceptor aircraft. However, its speed and rate of climb were only slightly better than existing propeller-powered fighters and fell short of other contemporary jets, such as the Lockheed P-80 Shooting Star, prompting concerns that the Phantom would be outmatched by future enemy jets it might soon face. Moreover, recent experience in World War II had demonstrated the value of naval fighters that could double as fighter-bombers, a capability the Phantom lacked. Finally, the aircraft exhibited some design deficiencies – its navigational avionics were poor, it could not accommodate newly developed ejection seats, and the location of the machine guns in the upper nose caused pilots to be dazzled by muzzle flash.

The F2H Banshee and Grumman F9F Panther, both of which began flight tests around the time of the Phantom's entry into service, better satisfied the navy's desire for a versatile, long-range, high-performance jet. Consequently, the FH-1 saw little weapons training, and was primarily used for carrier qualifications to transition pilots from propeller-powered fighters to jets in preparation for flying the Panther or Banshee. In June 1949, VF-171 (VF-17A) re-equipped with the Banshee, and their Phantoms were turned over to VF-172; this squadron, along with the NATC, VX-3, and VMF-122, turned over their Phantoms to the United States Naval Reserve by late 1949 after receiving F2H-1 Banshees. The FH-1 would see training duty with the USNR until being replaced by the F9F Panther in July 1954; none ever saw combat, having been retired from frontline service prior to the outbreak of the Korean War.

Civilian use
In 1964, Progressive Aero, Incorporated of Fort Lauderdale, Florida purchased three surplus Phantoms, intending to use them to teach civilians how to fly jets. A pair were stripped of military equipment and restored to flying condition, but the venture was unsuccessful, and the aircraft were soon retired once again.

Variants
XFD-1
 Prototype aircraft powered by  Westinghouse 19XB-2B engines (J-30). Two built.
FH-1 (FD-1) Production version with  Westinghouse J30-WE-20 engines (originally designated FD-1). 60 built.

Operators

 United States Navy
 VX-3
 VF-171 (VF-17A)
 VF-172
 Naval Air Reserve
 United States Marine Corps
 VMF-122
 VMF-311

Aircraft on display

FH-1
BuNo 111759 - National Air and Space Museum of the Smithsonian Institution in Washington, D.C., United States. This aircraft served with Marine Fighter Squadron 122 (VMF-122). It was retired in April 1954, with a total of 418 flight hours. The aircraft was transferred to the Smithsonian by the U.S. Navy in 1959.
BuNo 111768 - Pima Air & Space Museum, Tucson, Arizona, on loan from the National Museum of the Marine Corps, Triangle, Virginia. It has had a busy post-retirement life. Formerly a Progressive Aero aircraft c/n 456 (civil registration N4283A) it was placed on display at the Marine Corps Museum. The aircraft was later transferred to the St. Louis Aviation Museum, and then the National Warplane Museum in Geneseo, New York. In 2006 the aircraft was moved to the  Wings of Eagles Discovery Center in Horseheads, New York., and moved to Tucson in 2016.
BuNo 111793 - National Naval Aviation Museum at Naval Air Station Pensacola, Florida. This aircraft was accepted by the navy on 28 February 1948. After flying for a brief time with Marine Fighter Squadron (VMF) 122, the first Marine jet squadron, at Marine Corps Air Station Cherry Point, North Carolina, it was stricken from the naval inventory in 1949. The museum acquired the aircraft from National Jets, Inc., of Fort Lauderdale, Florida, in 1983.

Specifications (FH-1 Phantom)

See also

References

Notes

Citations

Bibliography
 Angelucci, Enzo and Peter M. Bowers. The American Fighter. Sparkford, Somerset, UK: Haynes Publishing Group, 1987. .

 Francillon, René J. McDonnell Douglas Aircraft since 1920. London: Putnam & Company, Ltd, 1979. .
Ginter, Steve. McDonnell FH-1 Phantom. (Naval Fighters Number 115) Simi Valley, California: Steve Ginter Books, 2022. 
 Green, William. War Planes of the Second World War, Volume Four: Fighters. London: MacDonald & Co. (Publishers) Ltd., 1961 (sixth impression 1969). .
 Green, William and Gordon Swanborough. WW2 Aircraft Fact Files: US Navy and Marine Corps Fighters. London: Macdonald and Jane's, 1976. .
 Grossnick, Roy A. "Part 6: Postwar Years: 1946–1949". United States Naval Aviation 1910–1995. Washington, D.C.: Naval Historical Center, 1997. .
 Hamilton, Hayden. "The McDonnell FH-1 Phantom: the Forgotten Phantom". AAHS Journal, Vol. 55, No. 2, Summer 2010.
 Mesko, Jim. FH Phantom/F2H Banshee in Action. Carrollton, Texas: Squadron/Signal Publications, Inc., 2002. .
 Mills, Carl. Banshees in the Royal Canadian Navy. Willowdale, Ontario, Canada: Banshee Publication, 1991. .
 "Mr Mac's First Phantom: The Story of the McDonnell FH-1". Air International Vol. 33, No. 5, November 1987, pp. 231–235, 258–260. Bromley, UK: Fine Scroll. .
 Wagner, Ray. American Combat Planes. New York: Doubleday, 3rd edition, 1982. .

External links

 "Phantom Development" a 1947 Flight article by John W. R. Taylor

Carrier-based aircraft
F1H Phantom
McDonnell F1H Phantom
World War II jet aircraft of the United States
Cruciform tail aircraft
Twinjets
Aircraft first flown in 1945